The Public Works Loan Board (PWLB) was a statutory body of the UK Government that provided loans to public bodies from the National Loans Fund. In 2020, the PWLB was abolished as a statutory organisation, and its functions were allocated to HM Treasury, where they are discharged through the UK Debt Management Office. The members of the PWLB were known as the Public Works Loan Commissioners.

History

Exchequer Loan and Bill Commissioners

Originally known as Exchequer Loan Commissioners, the Public Works Loan Commissioners were first appointed as an ad hoc body in 1793 to alleviate commercial distress resulting from the trade recession which followed the French Revolutionary Wars.

In 1817 another single purpose body of Commissioners, known as Exchequer Bill Commissioners, were appointed to provide relief following the Napoleonic Wars. They were to receive "no fee, reward or emolument or gratuity whatever" and their task was to consider applications in respect of any works of a public nature which might aid employment. In subsequent years, instead of appointing further bodies of Commissioners, Parliament prescribed additional purposes for lending for the existing Exchequer Bill Commissioners thus creating the continuous office of the Commissioners which has survived to present time. Over the subsequent 50 years a considerable number of public projects were financed by loans advanced by the Exchequer Bill Commissioners, including, in 1826, £400,000 for improvements to Charing Cross and the Strand which involved the formation of Trafalgar Square. In 1832, £250,000 was used for the construction of the Rotherhithe Tunnel under the River Thames and, in 1846, £200,000 for the establishment of Battersea Park.

Public Works Loan Commissioners
The next major landmark was the Public Works Loans Act 1875 which created the Public Works Loan Commissioners and replaced the Exchequer Bill Commissioners. The purpose of the Public Works Loan Commissioners was different from that of the Exchequer Bills Commission and the Exchequer Loan Commissioners as it was not focused on relieving commercial distress, but rather on providing funding to specific bodies for certain categories of expenditure. The Public Works Loans Act 1875, together with the National Loans Act 1968, became the prime statutory basis for the constitution, duties and operations of the Public Works Loan Commissioners. The Public Works Loans Act 1875 introduced a requirement that the Public Works Loan Commissioners make an annual report to Parliament.

In 1887 the method of funding lending by the Public Works Loan Commissioners was changed as it had become increasingly difficult to estimate the amount of loan applications. A Local Loans Fund was created pursuant to the National Debt and Local Loans Stock Act 1887, which was financed by the issue of Local Loans Stock, borrowings on the security of bonds, temporary borrowing and repayments of loans made. Pursuant to the terms of the Public Works Loans Act 1887, funds raised under the National Debt and Local Loans Stock Act 1887 were used to fund lending by the Public Works Loan Commissioners. In 1897 the responsibility for fixing the interest rates provided by the Public Works Loan Commissioners became vested in the Treasury, as is still the case today.

By the end of the First World War the foundations of the present local government structure were firmly in place and substantial funding was required for extensive development programmes of local authorities, particularly for housing and town planning; in 1921-22 nearly £49 million was lent for housing alone. By 1939 total lending by the Public Works Loan Commissioners had reached almost £600 million.

Towards the end of the Second World War, the Treasury issued a memorandum to local authorities which referred to the heavy demands on the money market that would be made after the end of the hostilities. It was proposed that local authorities should borrow for their capital development programmes through the government who would themselves raise money as part of their general borrowing programme. The rates of interest on loans to local authorities would be determined by the government’s own credit and the advances would be made by the Public Works Loan Commissioners.

Post-World War II
In 1963, a government white paper, noting the increased reliance of local authorities on temporary borrowing, proposed greater access to funding from the Public Works Loan Commissioners in return for a limitation on temporary debt under a quota system.

The National Loans Act 1968 re-organised the accounting arrangements and, since then, monies for local loans are provided by section 3 of the National Loans Act 1968 and drawn from the National Loans Fund (NLF). Certain obsolete or duplicated lending powers of the Public Works Loan Commissioners were repealed in the 1968 Act and the remainder consolidated. The Treasury’s power to fix the interest rates on loans made by the Public Works Loan Commissioners was re-enacted in terms corresponding with those prescribed for other loans made out of the NLF.

In 1982 the government, in support of its monetary policy, set out to reduce the dependence of local authorities on bank borrowing. The Public Works Loan Commissioners were asked to take steps to increase their share of lending and in a short time they revamped their lending facilities from being a provider of solely longer-term fixed rate funding which took up to ten days to advance to a wide range which included variable rate loans and one-year minimum periods.

Whilst the scope of the Public Works Loan Commissioners, and the source of funding, changed over time, ultimately the Commissioners were still responsible for assessing whether to lend money and to assess such matters as the level of security that should be required. In 2000 the government issued a green paper which suggested replacing the then-existing credit approval system for controlling capital expenditure with a prudential regime to determine affordability. This Green Paper was followed by a White Paper in 2001, which proposed a new prudential capital finance system. The framework for this proposal was introduced in the Local Government Act 2003. The framework provided by the Local Government Act 2003 was supplemented and developed through the Prudential Code, which was published by Chartered Institute of Public Finance and Accountancy (CIFPA). This formed the governance framework for the PWLB lending from 2004.

Since July 2002 it has been managed as part of the UK Debt Management Office, one of HM Treasury's executive agencies. In 2004, the decisions around borrowing requirements and how local authorities use PWLB funds were devolved to local authorities. Local authorities must comply with the Pudential Framework, which comprises the legislation and statutory codes that govern local authority borrowing and investment. There are four statutory codes, which authorities must have regard to, including the CIPFA-produced Prudential Code  and the Ministry of Housing, Communities and Local Government to ensure they are borrowing prudently. Following this reform, the role of Commissioners was merely ceremonial and existed so that government lending complied with the statute. Lending was managed within a policy framework set by HM Treasury and loans were processed through the DMO.

Subsequently, new governance arrangements were proposed in a consultation led by HM Treasury in 2016 and the Public Works Loan Commissioner role was formally abolished on 25 February 2020. Their statutory functions, roles and responsibilities transferred to HM Treasury. Day-to-day administration of PWLB loans continues via the DMO on HM Treasury’s behalf.

Operations
The PWLB provides loans to local authorities of all types in Great Britain, primarily for capital projects.

Eligible bodies
 English and Welsh county councils
 English district councils (including unitary authorities)
 Welsh county borough councils
 London borough councils
 the City of London Corporation
 the Greater London Authority and its functional bodies
 the councils of local government areas in Scotland
 parish and community councils
 the Council of the Isles of Scilly
 the Broads Authority
 integrated transport authorities and passenger transport executives
 police authorities
 fire and rescue authorities
 waste disposal authorities
 port health authorities
 other authorities in England, Wales or Scotland having power to levy council tax or to issue a precept or levy

Further reading

See also
Exchequer Bill Loan Commission
Local Government Funding Agency

References

External links
 

HM Treasury
Organisations based in the City of London
Defunct public bodies of the United Kingdom
1793 establishments in Great Britain